The Higher School Certificate, or HSC, was the credential awarded to secondary school students who successfully completed senior high school level studies (years 11 and 12 or equivalent) in the state of Victoria, Australia. In 1987, there was a trial of its successor, the Victorian Certificate of Education, and in 1992, it was completely replaced.

References

School qualifications
Education in Victoria (Australia)
Australian Certificate of Education
1992 disestablishments in Australia